The Foundation for the Preservation of the Mahayana Tradition (FPMT) was founded in 1975 by Lamas Thubten Yeshe and Thubten Zopa Rinpoche, who began teaching Mahayana Buddhism to Western students in Nepal. The FPMT has grown to encompass over 160 dharma centers, projects, and services in 37 countries. Since the death of Lama Yeshe in 1984, the FPMT's spiritual director has been Lama Zopa Rinpoche.

Location
The FPMT's international headquarters are in Portland, Oregon, United States. The central office has previously been located at:

 2000-2005 Taos, New Mexico
 1989-2000 Soquel, California (Land of Medicine Buddha)
 1984-1989 Pomaia, Italy (Istituto Lama Tzong Khapa)
 1975-1984 Kathmandu, Nepal (Kopan Monastery)

The FPMT has 165 centers in 40 countries worldwide.

History 
The name and structure of the FPMT date to 1975, in the wake of an international teaching tour by Lamas Yeshe and Zopa. However, the two had been teaching Western travelers since at least 1965, when they met Zina Rachevsky, their student and patron, in Darjeeling. In 1969, the three of them founded the Nepal Mahayana Gompa Centre (now Kopan Monastery). Rachevsky died shortly afterwards during a Buddhist retreat.

Lama Yeshe resisted Rachevsky's appeals to teach a "meditation course", on the grounds that in the Sera Monastery tradition in which he was educated, "meditation" would be attempted only after intensive, multi-year study of the Five Topics. However, he gave Lama Zopa permission to lead what became the first of Kopan's meditation courses (then semiannual, now annual) in 1971. Lama Zopa led these courses at least through 1975.

During the early 1970s, hundreds of Westerners attended teachings at Kopan. Historical descriptions and recollections routinely characterize early Western participants as backpackers on the hippie trail (extended overland tours of Asia)—to whom Lama Yeshe's style of discourse especially appealed.

Geoffrey Samuel finds it significant that Lamas Yeshe and Zopa had not yet attracted followings among the Tibetan or Himalayan peoples (Zopa's status as a minor tulku notwithstanding), and that their activities took place independently of any support or direction from the Central Tibetan Administration in Dharamsala. On his reading, their willingness to reach out to Westerners was in large measure the result of a lack of other sources of support. Nevertheless, Samuel sees their cultivation of an international network as having ample precedent in Tibet.

In December 1973, Lama Yeshe ordained fourteen Western monks and nuns under the name of the International Mahayana Institute. Around this time, Lama Yeshe's students began returning to their own countries. The result was the founding of an ever-increasing number of dharma centers in those countries.

In his description of the FPMT, Jeffrey Paine emphasizes the charisma, intuition, drive, and organizational ability of Lama Yeshe. Paine asks us to consider how a refugee with neither financial resources nor language skills could manage to create an international network with more than a hundred centers and study groups.

David N. Kay (see bibliography) makes the following observation:

As a result, says Kay (and Samuel's analysis concurs), at the same time that the FPMT was consolidating its structure and practices, several local groups and teachers defected, founding independent networks. Geshe Loden of Australia's Chenrezig Institute left the FPMT in 1979, in order to focus on his own network of centers. More consequentially, Kelsang Gyatso and his students caused the Manjushri Institute, the FPMT's flagship center in England, to sever its FPMT ties. At issue was whether the centers and their students ought to identify primarily with Lama Yeshe, local teachers, the Gelugpa tradition, or Tibetan Buddhism as a whole. The FPMT now asks its lamas to sign a "Geshe Agreement" which make explicit the organization's expectations. The latter rift widened in the wake of unrelated, post-1996 controversy over Dorje Shugden; the FPMT accepts the 14th Dalai Lama's ban on the worship of this deity, which only applies to those who wish to be his own disciples.

Lama Yeshe's death in 1984 led to his succession as spiritual director by Lama Zopa. In 1986, a Spanish boy named Tenzin Ösel Hita (a.k.a. Tenzin Ösel Rinpoche, or "Lama Ösel") was identified as the tulku of Lama Yeshe. As he came of age, Hita gave up his robes for a secular life, attending university in Spain, and became relatively inactive in the FPMT. In 2009, was quoted in several media sources as renouncing his role as a tulku—remarks which he later disavowed.

Structure

The FPMT is headed by a board of directors, with its spiritual director (presently Lama Zopa) an ex officio member. The FPMT International Office represents the board's executive function. The president / CEO of the FPMT is currently (2022) Ven. Roger Kunsang.

There are over 160 FPMT dharma centres, projects, services and study groups in 40 countries. Each affiliated center, project or service is separately incorporated and locally financed. There is no such thing as FPMT "membership" for individuals; rather, membership is held only by organizations (although several of these offer their own, local membership to individuals). In addition to its local board and officers, each FPMT center also has a spiritual program coordinator and in many cases, a resident geshe or teacher (and perhaps other Sangha as well).

The center directors and spiritual program coordinators from various countries meet every few years as the Council for the Preservation for the Mahayana Tradition (CPMT), in order to share experience and deliberate points of mutual concern.

The 14th Dalai Lama is credited with the honorary role of "inspiration and guide".

Programs

Students often first encounter the FPMT via short courses and retreats held at the various centers. The prototype of these is Kopan Monastery's annual month-long meditation course, offered since 1971. Many FPMT centers have adopted standardized curricula, whose modules may also be obtained on DVD for external study. The three sequences were separately developed, and thus are only loosely correlated with one another. They are as follows:

Discovering Buddhism, a two-year, fourteen-module lamrim course.
The FPMT Basic Program (five years, nine modules). As of 2015, at least thirty FPMT centers teach the Basic Program, or components thereof. Students desiring more advanced study have a number of options including:{
The FPMT Masters Program (since 1998) -- 7 years traditional study using compressed version of the Geshe curriculum. Designed to produce credentialed FPMT teachers. Its courses are mainly--but not exclusively--hosted by the Istituto Lama Tzong Khapa in Pomaia, Italy.
Maitripa College in Portland, Oregon (founded 2005, formal program began in 2006) -- 3-year MA (in Buddhist Studies) and M.Div. programs. The school intends to apply for regional accreditation.
Lotsawa Rinchen Zangpo Translator Program (since 1996) -- 2 years intensive Tibetan language study in Dharamsala, followed by 2 years interpretation residency. Designed to train FPMT interpreters.

Projects

FPMT maintains a number of charitable projects, including funds to build holy objects; translate Tibetan texts; support monks and nuns (both Tibetan and non-Tibetan); offer medical care, food and other assistance in impoverished regions of Asia; re-establish Tibetan Buddhism in Mongolia; and protect animals.

Perhaps the highest-profile FPMT project to date is the Maitreya Project. Originally a planned colossal statue of Maitreya to be built in Bodhgaya and/or Kushinagar (India), the project has been reconceived in the face of fund-raising difficulties and controversy over land acquisition, and now intends to construct a number of relatively modest statues. Jessica Marie Falcone's Battling the Buddha of Love: A Cultural Biography of the Greatest Statue Never Built (Cornell University Press, 2018; based on her Ph.D. dissertation in cultural anthropology for Cornell) is about the controversy, and the meaning of the proposed statue to FPMT participants and Kushinagari protesters.

Also to note is the Sera Je Food Fund offering 3 meals a day to the 2600 monks who are studying at Sera Je Monastery since 1991.

Publications

Wisdom Publications, now a well-known publisher of Buddhist books, originated at Kopan Monastery, Kathmandu, Nepal, in 1975 under editor Nicholas Ribush. Its first publication was Lama Yeshe's and Lama Zopa's Wisdom Energy. Directed by Nicholas Ribush, the publisher began formal operations in London in 1983 (after several years operating out of the Manjushri Institute), with Jeffrey Hopkins' Meditation on Emptiness (1983) as an early perennial. It moved to Boston in 1989, under director Timothy McNeill. The press offers both academic and popular Buddhist literature from all traditions of Buddhism, as well as translations of classic Buddhist literature. Especially noteworthy are its encyclopedia-style project, the 32-volume Library of Tibetan Classics (developed by Thupten Jinpa, English-language translator for the Dalai Lama); and the Teachings of the Buddha series of translations of the Pali Nikāyas.

Since 1995, the FPMT has published a glossy magazine called Mandala (now quarterly).

The Lama Yeshe Wisdom Archive, which holds copyright to the speeches and writings of Lama Yeshe and Lama Zopa, is one of the FPMT's member organizations. The LYWA archives and transcribes teachings by these and other lamas, and produces edited books for free distribution and for sale. Its director is Nicholas Ribush.

Notable Followers

Nita Ing, Taiwanese CEO of Taiwan High Speed Rail (THSR). 

Lillian Too, Malaysian-Chinese author of 80 books on feng shui. She recounts the story of her contact with Lama Zopa and the FPMT in The Buddha Book (Element, 2003) .

Daja Wangchuk Meston, American Tibet activist and author of a memoir, Comes the Peace: My Journey to Forgiveness (Free Press, March 6, 2007). Meston grew up as a (white) boy monk at Kopan monastery--his mother having left him to become a Buddhist nun under Lama Yeshe. He took his own life in 2010.

Jan Willis, Professor of Religion at Wesleyan University and author of several Buddhist books including her memoir, Dreaming Me: An African American Woman's Spiritual Journey (Riverhead, 2001). Willis was one of the earliest students of Lama Yeshe, who reportedly encouraged her in her academic career.

Gareth Sparham, British-born Tibetologist and translator of several Abhisamayalankara commentaries.

Thubten Gyatso (Adrian Feldmann), one of the first Westerners to become a Gelug monk.

Nick Ribush, an Australian ordained as a monk by Lama Yeshe, and the founder of several FPMT centers and projects.

See also
Kopan Monastery
Tara Institute
Maitreya Project
Root Institute
Lama Yeshe
Lama Zopa
Osel Hita Torres
Land of Medicine Buddha
Karuna Hospice

References

Bibliography

Cozort, Daniel. "The Making of the Western Lama". In Buddhism in the Modern World (Steven Heine & Charles S. Prebish, eds), Oxford UP: 2003, ch. 9. Focuses on the educational curricula of the FPMT and the New Kadampa Tradition.
Croucher, Paul. A History of Buddhism in Australia, 1848-1988. New South Wales UP, 1989. The FPMT is discussed on pp. 89–93, as well as on 112-113.
Eddy, Glenys. Western Buddhist Experience: The Journey From Encounter to Commitment in Two Forms of Western Buddhism. Ph.D dissertation for the Dept. of Studies in Religion, University of Sydney. 30 March 2007. Discusses the Vajrayana Institute (an Australian FPMT center) throughout, but especially in chapters 4,5, and 6.
Eddy, Glenys. "A Strand of Contemporary Tantra: Its Discourse and Practice in the FPMT". Global Buddhism no. 8, 2007. Extracted from her doctoral dissertation (see above).
Halafoff, Anna. "Venerable Robina Courtin: An Unconventional Buddhist?" In Cristina Rocha and Michelle Barker, Buddhism in Australia: Traditions in Change. Routledge, 2011. Courtin, a well-known FPMT nun, founded the Prison Liberation Project.
Kay, David N. Tibetan and Zen Buddhism in Britain. RoutledgeCurzon, 2004. The FPMT is discussed mainly on pp. 53–66, as background to the New Kadampa Tradition.
Magee, William. Three Models of Teaching Collected Topics Outside of Tibet. Conference paper presented to the Mongolian and Tibetan Affairs Commission of the ROC, 2004. Discusses Magee's experience studying the Collected Topics at the University of Virginia and the Dialectics Institute in Dharamsala, as well as teaching portions of these for Australia's Chenrezig Institute (an FPMT center).
Meston, Daja Wangchuk. Comes the Peace: My Journey to Forgiveness. Free Press, 2007. Memoir. Meston, a white American, was raised as a boy monk at Kopan.
Moran, Peter. Buddhism Observed: Travelers, Exiles, and Tibetan Dharma in Kathmandu. RoutledgeCurzon, 2004. An anthropological / sociological look at "Western" Buddhist tourists / pilgrims to Boudhanath. Kopan receives periodic mention, but see especially pp. 70–74.
Ong, Y.D. Buddhism in Singapore—a Short Narrative History. Skylark Publications, 2005. The Amitabha Buddhist Centre is mentioned briefly, on pp. 175–177.
Paine, Jeffrey. Re-Enchantment: Tibetan Buddhism Comes to the West. Norton, 2004. Chapter two discusses the role of Lama Yeshe and the FPMT.
Samuel, Geoffrey. "Tibetan Buddhism as a World Religion: Global Networking and its Consequences". Chapter 13 of Tantric Revisionings: New Understandings of Tibetan Buddhism and Indian Religion. Delhi: Motilal Banarsidass, 2005. pp. 288–316. The FPMT is discussed sporadically, beginning on p. 301, along with other "Western" Tibetan Buddhist groups.
Wangmo, Jamyang. The Lawudo Lama: Stories of Reincarnation from the Mount Everest Region. Wisdom Pub., 2005. The second part of the book contains Lama Zopa's reminiscences about his life, including his first meeting with Lama Yeshe (p. 199 ff) and Zina Rachevsky (p. 202), and the first Kopan course (p. 241 ff).
Willis, Jan.  Dreaming Me: An African American Woman's Spiritual Journey. Riverhead, 2001. Memoir. Willis, now an academic, was one of the earliest students of Lama Yeshe.

External links
 
FPMT Centers, Projects and Services
Diffi.cult: 'Will the FPMT stand by its Code of Ethics?'
Lotsawa Rinchen Zangpo Translator Program
Land of Medicine Buddha
Choe Khor Sum Ling, Bangalore
 Lama Zopa Rinpoche - How I Was Recognized as a Tulku
FPMT a Documentary (YouTube video)

 
Tibetan Buddhist organizations